Pasumpon is a 1995 Indian Tamil-language drama film directed by Bharathiraja, starring Prabhu, Sivaji Ganesan, Sivakumar, Raadhika and Saranya Ponvannan. It was released on 14 April 1995.

Plot 
For several years, Thangapandi is in feud with his stepbrothers Sellasamy and Raasa.

In the past, Durairasu Thevar, the village chief was very rich and highly respected in his area. His only heir Nachiyar married a rich man of neighbouring village as per Durairasu's wishes. A few years later, Nachiyar has a boy and he is named Thangapandi. Within weeks of Thangapandi's birth, nachiyaar's husband dies, and Durairasu Thevar becomes distraught. Seeing the young widow, his health deteriorates. He then forces her daughter to remarry with her maternal cousin Kathiresan Thevar, so that she may have a safe life. Thangapandi who was aged 8 by then, hated his step-dad. Two years later, Nachiyar has another boy baby, and Thangapandi became jealous of the newborn Sellasamy. He leaves the house and decided to live with his grandfather Durairasu Thevar, in a grand house in the same street. After Durairasu Thevar's death, the conflict has hardened. Thangpandi manages all of the properties left by his Grandfather, and refuses to acknowledge that his mother is alive.

The liquor smuggler Angusamy hates Thangapandi since the latter beats him up in public one day. Sellasamy wants to get married as soon as possible after his uncle Angusamy convinced him to, but that's disrespectful to not arrange the marriage for the elder son first. Finally, Sellasamy got married before Thangapandi.

Meanwhile, Malar is in love with her cousin Thangapandi, and he proposes to her. At Thangapandi's marriage, Nachiyar comes to see it secretly, and she witnesses how her son Thangapandi loves her secretly. When Sellasamy and his family go to Angusamy's house to ask his daughter's hand for Raasa, a fight occurs and Thangapandi comes to the aid of his brothers. The younger brothers realise the worth of their elder one.

The next day, Thangapandi gets a widow with a baby boy married to her cousin whom she loves, to protect the girl's future. Malar cites that the same was done 25 years ago by his Grandfather, and it has become old enough for Thangapandi to accept his mother and step-family. This puts Thangapandi into deep thoughts. Later, Nachiyar falls ill due to a head injury in the fight, and Thangapandi feeds her last milk (Thalaikoothal) to choke her and to finally end her sufferings. The family reconciles.

Cast 
Prabhu as Thangapandi
Sivaji Ganesan as Durairasu Thevar
Sivakumar as Kathiresan Thevar
Raadhika as Nachiyar
Saranya Ponvannan as Malar (voice-over by Revathi)
Ponvannan as Sellasamy
Vignesh as Raasa
Vadivelu as Sonnaiya
Ilavarasu as Angusamy
Yuvarani as Thenmozhi
Shenbagam as Paramakudiya
Dubbing Janaki as Chellathayi, Malar's mother
S.R. Vijaya as Angusamy's wife
Periya Karuppu Thevar as Kanakku Pillai
Theni Kunjarammal
Theni Murugan

Production
Bharathiraja initially launched a film called Thiruvizha with Prabhu in lead however the film failed to proceed after the launch. Bharathiraja then launched a different film with Prabhu and Sivaji Ganesan which eventually became Pasumpon.

Soundtrack 
The soundtrack was composed by Vidyasagar, with lyrics written by Vairamuthu. The tune of the song "Thaamara Poovukku" was later reused in the song "Ishq Mein Pyar Mein" in the Hindi film Hulchul which also had music by Vidyasagar.

Reception
R. P. R. of Kalki wrote Bharathiraja, in this film, has squeezed out the struggle of affection, so we can hope that he will come out from that phase in the next one.

References

External links 

1990s Tamil-language films
1995 films
Films directed by Bharathiraja
Films scored by Vidyasagar
Indian drama films